2018 MCC Tri-nation series was a  cricket tournament that was held on 29 July 2018 at Lord's in England. The series featured Nepal, Netherlands and Marylebone Cricket Club (MCC), with the matches played as Twenty20 fixtures. The third fixture, between Nepal and the Netherlands, was given full Twenty20 International (T20I) status by the International Cricket Council (ICC).

Rain affected all three matches. The first two fixtures were both reduced to six overs per side. In the third and final match, only 16.4 overs of play was possible, with the game ending in a no result. Nepal and the Netherlands shared the series.

Squads

Points table

T20 series

1st T20

2nd T20

3rd T20

References

International cricket competitions in 2018
Twenty20 International cricket competitions
MCC Tri-Nation Series
MCC Tri-Nation Series